The Infiniti Q45 is a full-size luxury sedan manufactured and marketed by Nissan's Infiniti brand for model years 1989-2006, over three generations.

The first generation Q45 (1989–1999) was based on the Nissan President; the second generation (1997–2000) and third generation (2002–2006) were based on Nissan's JDM Nissan Cima. Exports of the Q45 ended after MY 2006.



First generation (G50; 1989–1996)

All Q45s included a VLSD (viscous limited-slip differential), as part of a multi-link suspension. At the time, Nissan was working on a program called the "901 Movement," with the aim of making Nissan's the best handling lineup in the industry. In Japan, it was marketed as the Nissan Infiniti Q45, and was exclusive to Nissan Prince Store locations, as its platform twin the President was exclusive to Nissan Motor Store locations.

Equipment included a Bose sound system, leather interior, power adjustable front passenger seats with two position memory feature that also electrically adjusted the steering wheel, exterior mirrors, one-touch power windows, digital climate control, and keyless entry system.

It was equipped with instrument lighting using a reverse effect of white light on the gauges with black numbers. Revisions in 1993 included 17:1 steering (except on the Q45t, which retained the original 15.1:1 ratio), lower ratio 1st and 2nd gears, and a dynamically smooth suspension, thicker glass, keyless remote, auto-dim rear-view mirror, dipping side view mirrors, revised transmission heat exchanger and external ATF filter, revised oval intake ports and revised disc injectors, fog lights and metal-backed camshaft timing chain guides.

Infiniti offered the Q45 in three trim levels: base, Q45t, and Q45a. The Q45t and Q45a featured a multi-link suspension at both the front and rear wheels, and included a rear stabilizer bar (with the Q45a model being larger in diameter) and both models having a 1 mm smaller in diameter front sway bar, rear spoiler, BBS forged alloy wheels, 4-wheel steering.  HICAS and the faster steering ratios was discontinued in the 1995 Q45t model and the Q45a model was not imported in 1996.

In 1989 (as a 1990 model) a full "active suspension (FAS)" was introduced. It employed 10 sensors sending signals to microprocessor-controlled hydraulic actuators at each wheel. It was designed to reduce body roll, dive and pitch and was very similar to Mercedes-Benz's Active Body Control, which was introduced in 1999 on the C215 CL-Class.

The contemporary upstart luxury marque Lexus (Toyota) had managed to challenge the establish dominance of European full-size luxury cars with the LS 400, so the Q45 seemed poised for similar success with comparable specifications and price to the LS 400 while featuring more emphasis upon handling. However Q45 sales didn't take off which was attributed to the car's unconventional styling, particularly the grille and lack of interior woodgrain or chrome trim. There was also an unusual advertising campaign which did not include actual photos or information about the car.

In 1993 the Infiniti brand was launched in Australia with the sole model on offer being the Q45. With a price of A$140,000, the Q45 sold poorly and the brand was subsequently withdrawn from the market in 1996. The G50 chassis continued in production in Japan until 2002 as the President in both regular and extended wheelbase versions. The Japanese version had many options that never appeared on the North American G50.

Second generation (Y33; 1997–2000)

The second generation Q45 was a lightly revised variant of Nissan’s JDM Nissan Cima, using the Cedric / Gloria platform. For the prior generation, the Q45 took its name from its 4.5-liter V8; the nameplate remained though the second generation, which featured a 4.1 L VH41DE engine producing  and acceleration figures of 0- in about 7.5 seconds. Styling featured an inverse curve C-pillar, and a pronounced full-length horizontal character beltline.

The Q45 Anniversary Edition, limited to 3,000 units, offered highest trim level available for the second-generation Q45, available on 2000 models and standard on the 2001 models. The package included all features of the Q45t model along with “Anniversary Edition” markings on the tailgate badge, ignition key, front seat embossing and floor mats as well as genuine wood trim, wood tone/leather steering wheel, special bright machine finish 17-inch performance wheels and exclusive body color door handles.

The Q45t featured 17-inch wheels and tires, electronically modulated performance-tuned suspension, blackout grille, blackout headlight treatment, performance style steering wheel and “t” badging on the rear decklid.

The Q45 front and rear fascias were slightly revised for 1999; HID headlights and an analog clock became standard equipment. 17" wheels and an electronic adjustable suspension became standard on the Q45t.

Standard features for the second-generation Q45 included traction control, leather interior with faux wood trim, single (later dual) zone climate control, Bose audio system with eight speakers and in-dash single disc CD player, auto dimming rear view mirror, automatic light on and delay off timer, steering wheel-mounted cruise control and head unit controls. Also standard was a memory system for the driver's seat and steering wheel. Options included an integrated satellite navigation system, 6-disc CD autochanger and heated seats.

Nearly all Infinitis before or since have used a two-digit number following a letter to indicate displacement; the second-generation Q was an exception (as was the Nissan Pathfinder clone QX4).

Model Year Changes
1998 New front seastbelt pretensioners, mechanical odometer replaced with a liquid crystal display unit from January 1998 production. 
1999 New standard features included power rear-window sunshade, power trunklid pull-down, and high-intensity xenon gas headlights. Touring edition (Q45t) gained dual-mode electronically controlled shock absorbers.
2000 New active front head restraints; rear child-seat anchors; one-touch open/close operation for the standard moonroof and all power windows. A newly optional nav system with dashboard touch-screen replaced a simpler, non-video system. The 10th Anniversary Touring edition had machine-finish wheels, special badges and upholstery, wood/leather steering wheel, and bird’s-eye maple interior accents. New platinum-tip spark plugs.
2001 Body-color door handles, bird’s-eye maple interior trim, and a leather/simulated-wood steering wheel were the only changes for 2001.

Third generation (F50; 2001–2006)

Introduced as a concept at the 2000 New York Auto Show, the Q45 was completely redesigned for 2002 and was heavily based on the JDM Cima. This Q45 focused on performance again with a new 340 hp (253 kW) 4.5 L VK45DE V8 engine, HID headlights, and revised styling. The car featured a 5-speed automatic transmission with overdrive.

Development began in 1996, with exterior designs under Mamori Aoki frozen in 1998 and patented in March 2000. It was the first Infiniti with laser autonomous cruise control system.

1129 Q45s were sold in the United States for 2005. The 3rd generation Q45 reviewed by Car and Driver, Edmunds and Consumer Guide, receiving relative positive reviews.

The 2003 model received a revised security system, numerically higher final drive ratio (for better acceleration - decreased highway fuel economy), reprogrammed TCU, and a mid-year satellite radio option. The CD changer could load CDs directly at the dashboard head unit.

Standard equipment included a leather interior, power sunroof, 8-way power front seats, remote keyless entry, rain-detecting wipers and side curtain airbags. Standard electronics include: CD, 8 speaker Bose audio system, trip computer, rear view parking camera system, and voice-activated navigation system. The 2002 Q45 was the first vehicle to ever offer voice-activated navigation controls and a reverse parking camera outside Japan, following the JDM 1991 Toyota Soarer.

The 2005 Q45 received revised front and rear fascias, hood, grille, trunk decklid and finisher, headlights, revised exterior chrome trim, integrated fog lights and LED taillights, recontoured double-stitched seating, white luminescent gauge markings, genuine metal knobs for accessory controls, a darker shade of maple interior trim, recalibrated transmission and new 17" alloy wheels.

Replacement
The Infiniti Q45 was no longer exported to the USA after 2006, being unintentionally replaced by a newly redesigned Infiniti M35/45. While the M is a mid-luxury (executive) car that has a shorter length than the Q45, it boasts more interior room, greater performance, a superior rear multilink suspension and front double wishbone, and much friendlier ergonomics, so it succeeded the Q45 as Infiniti's flagship.

A new Q flagship was anticipated by the end of the 2000s decade. According to Mark Igo, the general manager of Infiniti North America, "the new Q will make the brand better, but it is questionable whether it will be very profitable".

Infiniti introduced the next iteration of its flagship, the Y51 series Infiniti M37/56/Nissan Fuga in November 2009.

By August 2010 the Nissan Cima, on which the final generation Q45 essentially was based, had been discontinued in Japan, along with its Nissan President sibling. This made the second generation Nissan Fuga the marque's top-of-the-line flagship sedan. When the Fuga assumed the role as flagship sedan of Nissan Japan August 2010, it became the first time that Nissan didn't sell a premium luxury V8 sedan in Japan, although the Fuga's North American cousin, the Infiniti M56, is offered with a V8 shared with the Infiniti QX56.

In May 2012, Nissan released a new version of the Cima in Japan, based on the Fuga Hybrid (Infiniti M35h).

On 17 December 2012, Infiniti announced that all of its future sedan offerings will use the Q prefix, starting from the Q50 as a G37 replacement, Q70 for its M35/45/56 replacement, and a rumored Q80 for the new flagship model.

References

External links

Official Infiniti USA site
Q No Longer Available, See Infiniti M
Official Canadian site
1997 Q45 vs 1997 Lexus LS 400 Motor Trend article

Q45
Rear-wheel-drive vehicles
Full-size vehicles
Flagship vehicles
Sedans
1990s cars
2000s cars
Cars introduced in 1989
Vehicles with four-wheel steering
Cars discontinued in 2008